Carlos Ruiz-Tagle (born February 12, 1932 – † September 22, 1991. Born as Carlos Ruiz-Tagle Gandarillas) was a Chilean writer.

Life

Ruiz-Tagle was born in Santiago, Chile to father Carlos Ruiz-Tagle Vicuña and mother Elena Gandarillas Rooms. He attended primary and secondary education at Saint George's School in Santiago and later studied agronomical engineering at the Catholic University of Chile.

References

External links
 Escritores.cl, Ruiz Tagle biography

1932 births
1991 deaths
Pontifical Catholic University of Chile alumni
Chilean male writers
People from Santiago